Kjell Håkan Dahlin (born 2 March 1963) is a Swedish former professional ice hockey forward. He played for the Montreal Canadiens in the NHL in the mid-1980s.

NHL
Dahlin was drafted by the Montreal Canadiens in 1981 in the fourth round as the 82nd pick overall. Dahlin played in Sweden until 1985 when he joined the Canadiens.

In his first season in the NHL he played 77 games and scored 32 goals and 71 points, tying a club record for points by a rookie that was set by countryman and teammate Mats Näslund and also setting a club rookie goals record. His point total made him the top scoring rookie that season but an outstanding season by first-year defenceman Gary Suter kept Dahlin from capturing the rookie of the year honors, though he was named to the NHL All-Rookie Team. Despite his scoring ways during the regular season, Dahlin was held to just two goals and five points in the playoffs, while the Canadiens went on to win the Stanley Cup in 1986.

In his second season injuries limited Dahlin to just 41 games and his point total dropped to 20. In 1987–88, Dahlin's third year, injuries again limited him as he played just 48 games this time scoring 25 points.

Back to Sweden
With diminishing returns and bad luck on the injury front, Dahlin opted to return to Sweden for the 1988–89 campaign. Dahlin rejoined Färjestads BK, the Swedish Elite League club team he spent three seasons with before joining Montreal. Dahlin played six seasons with them then retired from the game in 1994.

Dahlin only played 11 games with the Swedish national team, and never played with them in any major tournament.

Career statistics

Regular season and playoffs

International

External links
Kjell Dahlin's profile, stats and NHL game log at the National Hockey League website
Kjell Dahlin's profile and stats (with image holding the Stanley Cup) at Elite Hockey Prospects
Kjell Dahlin's profile and stats at European Hockey.Net
Kjell Dahlin's profile and stats at the Internet Hockey Database
Kjell Dahlin's "Legends of Hockey" profile and stats at the Hockey Hall of Fame website
Kjell Dahlin's "Legends of Hockey" gallery image (playing for the Montreal Canadiens)

1963 births
Färjestad BK players
Living people
Montreal Canadiens draft picks
Montreal Canadiens players
People from Timrå Municipality
Stanley Cup champions
Swedish expatriate ice hockey players in Canada
Swedish ice hockey right wingers
Timrå IK players
Winnipeg Jets scouts
Sportspeople from Västernorrland County